The DLF Mall of India is a shopping mall situated in Sector 18, Noida, Uttar Pradesh, India. The mall is spread over 7 floors, and  includes 330 brands, 80 kiosks, 5 customized shopping zones, along with 75 food and beverages options and a movie theatre (PVR Cinemas) with 7 screens. Developed by DLF Limited, the mall was expected to be operational by December 2014, but eventually opened for public in February 2016. 

Mall of India was planned and designed by the British architectural firm Benoy, with six customized shopping levels including international and Indian fashion, dedicated kids zone, entertainment, international cafes, food court and restaurants with a race track atrium. It is a popular hub for shopping, entertainment  and dining.

However, in November 2008, construction work at the mall, after initial land lease and digging, was put on hold due to overall fall in retail rentals. Thus its current status is held in a stalled state.

References

Shopping malls in Uttar Pradesh
Buildings and structures in Noida
Economy of Noida
2016 establishments in Uttar Pradesh
Shopping malls established in 2016

h